Marble Mountain is a 3,366-foot (1,026-meter) mountain summit located in the Fairweather Range of the Saint Elias Mountains, in southeast Alaska. Although modest in elevation, relief is significant since the mountain rises up from tidewater in Shag Cove in less than one mile. The mountain's name was in local use as reported by the United States Geological Survey in 1951. Marble Mountain can be seen from Glacier Bay which is a popular destination for cruise ships. The months May through June offer the most favorable weather for viewing and climbing Marble Mountain.

Climate

Based on the Köppen climate classification, Marble Mountain is located in a subpolar oceanic climate zone, with long, cold, wet winters, and cool summers. Temperatures can drop below −20 °C with wind chill factors below −30 °C. Precipitation runoff from the mountain  drains into Glacier Bay Basin.

See also

List of mountain peaks of Alaska
Geography of Alaska

References

External links
 Weather forecast: Marble Mountain

Mountains of Glacier Bay National Park and Preserve
Saint Elias Mountains
Landforms of Hoonah–Angoon Census Area, Alaska
Mountains of Alaska
North American 1000 m summits